Eriophyllum multicaule is a North American flowering plant in the family Asteraceae, known by the common name manystem woolly sunflower. It is native to California and Arizona in the southwestern United States.

Eriophyllum multicaule grows in chaparral habitat, especially along the California coast. This is a small, branching, clump-forming annual herb rarely more than 15 cm (6 inches) tall. It has fleshy stems and foliage in shades of bright green to purplish green. The small leaves are about one centimeter (0.4 inches) long, sometimes woolly, and shaped like a wedge with three small teeth at the end. The inflorescences at the ends of the stems are clusters of tiny flower heads, each bright golden yellow with a center of 10-20 disc florets surrounded by 5-7 ray florets each about two millimeters (0.08 inches) long.

References

External links
Jepson Manual Treatment
United States Department of Agriculture Plants Profile
Calphotos Photo gallery, University of California

multicaule
Flora of California
Flora of Arizona
Endemic flora of the United States
Natural history of the California chaparral and woodlands
Plants described in 1836
Taxa named by Asa Gray
Flora without expected TNC conservation status